WHAR (105.1 FM) is a radio station broadcasting a Christian Worship format branded as Air 1. WHAR is licensed to Havelock, North Carolina. The station was sold in 2010 by NM Licensing LLC. The station is owned by the Educational Media Foundation and in April 2018, the callsign changed to WHAR. It is not active on Radio Garden.

History
This station was previously WKVO-FM until 1978, then WMSQ Q105 through the early 1990s, until they switched to Country music in 1996 with the letters WANG-FM. Later, WANG-FM switched to adult standards. The station switched briefly to Westwood One oldies; on April 17, 2005, the call letters changed to WKOO (Kool 105.1"). On June 13, 2005, the station changed to the Westwood One "Sam FM" adult hits format and the WSSM call letters.

In October 2006, WSSM returned to Dial-Global's Adult Standards format "America's Best Music".

In late April 2008, the WSSM returned to the SAM "Simply About Music" adult hits format.

On May 27, 2010, WSSM ceased operation as it changed formats when sold by NextMedia Group under new ownership and changed call letters to WLVG.

Call sign history
The station was assigned call sign WKVO-FM in 1971, and was sold to MusicRadio, Inc. (a Maryland group) who changed the calls to WMSQ in 1978. The station was a very valuable asset to the town of Havelock, N.C. and the nearby Marine Air Station at Cherry Point during several hurricanes in the 1980s. Havelock's business "golden age" peaked during the station's successful years from 1979 to 1990, partly due to the community involvement of station management and personalities. Arbitron ratings consistently saw the small station competing with much more powerful FM stations in nearby New Bern and Washington, N.C. On August 15, 1996, the station changed its call sign to WANG; on January 22, 1999 to WANG-FM; on April 11, 2005 to WKOO; on June 21, 2005 to WSSM; on March 10, 2008 to WRQR, then back to WSSM. On May 27, 2010, the calls were changed to WLVG.

On April 16, 2018, the station changed its call sign to WHAR.

References

External links

Air1 radio stations
Contemporary Christian radio stations in the United States
Radio stations established in 1971
1971 establishments in North Carolina
Educational Media Foundation radio stations
HAR